Seminella is a genus of sea snails, marine gastropod mollusks in the family Columbellidae, the dove snails.

Species
Species within the genus Seminella include:
 Seminella biconica K. Monsecour & D. Monsecour, 2016
 Seminella comistea (Melvill, 1906)
 Seminella corrugata K. Monsecour & D. Monsecour, 2016
 Seminella infirmisculpta K. Monsecour & D. Monsecour, 2018
 Seminella makemoensis K. Monsecour & D. Monsecour, 2015
 Seminella peasei (Martens & Langkavel, 1871)
  Seminella roseotincta (Hervier, 1899)
 Seminella virginea (Gould, 1860)

References

External links
 Pease, W.H. (1868). Notes on the remarks of Dr. P. P. Carpenter (published in Proc. Zool. Soc. Lond., 1865), on certain species of marine Gastropoda, named by W. Harper Pease. American Journal of Conchology. 3(3): 231-234

Columbellidae